Pedro Hernández (born August 14, 1999) is an American soccer player who plays as a midfielder for Chattanooga Red Wolves SC in the USL League One.

Career

College
Hernández attended California State University, Monterey Bay in 2017 to play college soccer, going on to make 56 appearances for the Otters, scoring 16 goals and tallying eight assists. He was also a member of the 2019 and 2020 CCAA All–Academic teams.

Professional
On January 21, 2022, Hernández signed with USL League One club Chattanooga Red Wolves. He made his professional debut on April 2, 2022, appearing as an 83rd–minute substitute in a 1–1 draw with Forward Madison.

References

External links
 Chattanooga Red Wolves profile

1999 births
Living people
American soccer players
Association football midfielders
Chattanooga Red Wolves SC players
People from Walnut Creek, California
Soccer players from California
USL League One players